Bianca Garavelli (23 August 1958 – 29 December 2021) was an Italian writer and literary critic known for her work on the writings of Dante Alighieri. She died on 29 December 2021, at the age of 63.

References

1958 births
2021 deaths
20th-century Italian writers
21st-century Italian writers
Italian women writers
Italian literary critics
Italian women literary critics
Italian philologists
University of Pavia alumni
People from Vigevano